The Connacht Junior Cup or Connaught Junior Cup is a cup competition organised by the Connacht Football Association for junior association football clubs. In the seasons when there has been no active Connacht Senior League or Connacht Senior Cup, this junior cup competition has effectively been the top level competition for non-League of Ireland clubs affiliated to the CFA. As a result, it is often simply just referred to as the Connacht Cup or Connaught Cup. The inaugural winners were Galway Town. The competition's most successful clubs have been Castlebar Celtic and Galway Bohemians who have been winners at least nine times each. Sligo Rovers, Longford Town, Galway Rovers and Mervue United were all winners before going on to join the League of Ireland.

List of finals

Notes

References

6
2
1928 establishments in Ireland